Nguyen Phan Chanh (July 21, 1892 - November 22, 1984) was born in a rural Vietnamese village, in Ha Tinh (now Nghe Tinh) province. His early education was in Chinese (as was common in pre-colonial times), and he studied Chinese calligraphy so as to pass the qualifying exams for the title of Mandarin. However, the exams were abolished before he was old enough to sit them. With his first ambition thwarted, it was decided that he should continue studying painting at the l’Ecole des Beaux-arts d’Indochine ("the Indochinese College of Fine Arts") in Hanoi.

The pamphlets describing the goals for l’Ecole des Beaux-arts d’Indochine used the phrase “to transform the indigenous craftsmen into professional artists” which reflects the colonial mind-set of civilizing and educating ‘the natives’ (Taylor, 2004: 36). However, despite these rather condescending aims, Victor Tardieu, and his co-founder, Nam Son Nguyen Van Tho, and their colleague Joseph Imguimberty, in addition to introducing observation-based drawing classes, composition and oil painting, did not simply impose European art techniques, theories and media, they also included the study of oriental media such as woodblock printing, silk and lacquer painting in the curriculum, which demonstrates their interest in and openness to local culture and traditions. It seems that despite the inevitable resentment of colonialism at that time, the individual people involved in establishing l’Ecole des Beaux-arts d’Indochine had a genuine interest in, and recognition of, the potential of Vietnamese art (especially painting), and a rapport with the students that helped to build an artistic community.

Chanh was one of the early entrants to the newly opened French-established l’Ecole des Beaux-arts d’Indochine in 1925, 33 years of age, older than many of his classmates, and from a different and more rural geographical region. According to Huynh (2005:125-6) ‘Chanh was considered a rather awkward student, who insisted on maintaining tradition’ and it has been suggested that his peers and French tutors considered his focus on representing village life rather unsophisticated and old-fashioned. Whilst Chanh had struggled with oil painting, he ‘established himself as a master’ at silk painting.

Painting on silk is considered to be a traditionally Chinese art form, although Chanh  argued it ‘expressed the national (Vietnamese) character to the highest degree’ and goes on to talk about the enthusiastic reception given to his and other artists in their exhibition in Hanoi, 1954-1955, where opinion stated that the paintings were ‘neither Chinese, Japanese or French.‘ (i.e. that they were distinctively Vietnamese). The emphasis given to silk painting being an art form which effectively expresses Vietnam’s national identity reflects the political context of the times, and the directives from Truong Chinh (Marxism and Vietnamese Culture) and Ho Chi Minh, that art should follow the socialist agenda and be a form of propaganda, glorifying the peasants and soldiers of Vietnam.

Chanh participated in both National resistance wars, was a keen patriot, and in the post-colonial era (after 1945) was praised for the fact that his artwork that illustrated Vietnamese village life and history in modest and simple terms, often interpreted as a continuation of native ‘folk’ art tradition, which in the newly established republic represented his resilience against foreign domination.

Nguyen Phan Chanh experienced, and was inevitably influenced, by the rapidly changing politics and external influences (particularly in education) in Vietnam during his lifetime, most notably Chinese and French; however, his work is unique, elegant and poignant, and is internationally recognized as such.

International exhibitions of Chanh's silk paintings include Paris 1931, Italy in 1934, America in 1937, Japan in 1940, then in Czechoslovakia, Hungary and Romania in 1982, and Poland and the former Soviet Union in 1983.

In 2013, at Christie's Hong Kong, Chanh’s  La Marchand de Riz (The Rice Seller),  initially valued at just 50 pounds sterling ($75) sold for HK$3.03 million ($390,000) setting a record for a work by a Vietnamese artist. When the British seller of the 1932 work took it to Christie’s in London, it was mistakenly identified as a Chinese work because the artist signed his name in Chinese characters. After it was forwarded to specialists in Asia, they recognized the painting by the artist’s signature in romanized characters on the back of the canvas and valued it at between HK$800,000 and HK$1 million.

May 26, painting  La Marchande de Oc (The Snail Seller - Nguoi ban oc) by Vietnamese master artist Nguyen Phan Chanh, was sold for US$600,000 (HKD4.66 million). And May 27, 2018, another painting  was sold at over US$853,000 (HKD6.7 million) at an auction by Christie’s Hong Kong, the painting depicts a girl feeding her bird, Enfant à l'oiseau (Child with Bird - Em be ben chu chim), ink and colour powder on silk.

The auction with name "20th Century & Contemporary Art" on 29 May 2019, painting Le Jeu des Cases Gagnantes (Playing 'Go'-Choi co) was sold for US$440,000 (HKD3.458 million) by Christie’s Hong Kong.

Works
A few of his works are in the Vietnam National Museum of Fine Arts, Hanoi, but most are in private galleries and collections.

Typical paintings are like: Carré mandarin (Mandarin square - Choi o an quan), La fille lave les légumes (The girl washing vegetables - Co gai rua rau), Lune (Moon - Trang lu), Tien Dung va Chu Dong Tu, Bonheur (Happies - Hanh phuc)...

References

Balfour, Frederik (2013) Bloomberg Businessweek: Vietnamese Work First Valued at $75 Fetches Record $390,000 http://www.businessweek.com/news/2013-05-25/vietnamese-painting-sells-for-record-390-000-at-christie-s-hk (Accessed on: 24.01.2014)

Can, Tran Van et al. (1987) Contemporary Vietnamese Painters: Hanoi: Red River

Geringer Art Ltd. (2009) NGUYEN PHAN CHANH (Vietnamese, 1892-1984). http://www.geringerart.com/bios/chanh.html (Accessed on 24.01.14)

Huynh, Boi Tranh (2005) Vietnamese Aesthetics from 1925 onwards [Phd thesis] Sydney College of the Arts: University of Sydney Australia.

Huynh-Beattie, Boitran (2012) ‘Vietnamese Modern Art: An unfinished Journey’ In: Taylor, N.A. & Ly, B. (eds) Modern and contemporary South East Asian Art. USA. Cornell Southeast Asia Program Publications

Taylor, Nora Annesley (2004) Painters in Hanoi: An ethnography of Vietnamese Art. Hawai’i: University of Hawai’i Press

Trinh Van Thao (1995) L’ecole francaise en Indochine. Paris: Karthala

1892 births
1984 deaths
People from Hà Tĩnh province
20th-century Vietnamese painters